Anticrates chrysantha is a moth of the family Lacturidae first described by Edward Meyrick in 1905. It is found in Sri Lanka.

References

Moths of Asia
Moths described in 1905
Heliodinidae